Rangrang station is a railway station in Kin'gol-li, Rangrang-guyŏk, P'yŏngyang, North Korea. It is the terminus of the Rangrang Line of the Korean State Railway, which connects to the mainline at Ryŏkp'o.

The station, opened in 1989, is used to supply coal to the East P'yŏngyang Thermal Power Plant, whose construction was started in the same year.

References

Railway stations in North Korea
Buildings and structures in Pyongyang
Transport in Pyongyang
Railway stations opened in 1989
1989 establishments in North Korea